The discography of Christian pop punk band Stellar Kart, which consists of five studio albums, two EPs, sixteen singles, and seven music videos.

Studio albums

Singles

Music videos 

 "Student Driver"
 "Life Is Good"
 "Activate"
 "Me and Jesus"
 "Innocent"
 "All In (Apologize)"
 "Criminals And Kings"
 "Hold On"

References 

Discographies of American artists
Christian music discographies